Campo Formio is a station of the Paris Métro, serving line 5 located in the 13th arrondissement of Paris.

History
The station opened on 6 June 1906. The name refers to Rue de Campo Formio, named for the Treaty of Campo Formio in 1797 between France and Austria. France obtained Belgium, part of the left bank of the Rhine, the Ionian Islands, and the recognition of the Cisalpine Republic. German bombing in World War I damaged this station in 1918.

During the summer of 2007, the station was the provisional terminus of Line 5 following the closure of the platforms at the Place d'Italie station and the construction of the boucle d'Italie.

In 2018, 1,369,978 travelers entered this station which places it at 285th position of the metro stations for its attendance.

Location
The station is located under the Boulevard de l'Hôpital on the corner of Rue de Campo-Formio.

Passenger services

Station layout

Platforms
Campo-Formio metro station has a standard configuration. It has two platforms separated by metro tracks and the roof is elliptical. The decor is the style used for the majority of metro stations, the lighting strips are white and rounded in the Gaudin style of the metro revival of the 2000s, and the bevelled white ceramic tiles cover the walls, the roof and the tympan. The advertising frames are metallic and the name of the station is in Parisine font on enamelled plate. It is one of the few stations without seating arrangements.

Bus connections
The station is served by Lines 57 and 67 of the RATP Bus Network.

Gallery

References

Roland, Gérard (2003). Stations de métro. D’Abbesses à Wagram. Éditions Bonneton.

Paris Métro stations in the 13th arrondissement of Paris
Railway stations in France opened in 1906